Brandon Clifford Poulson (born February 16, 1990) is an American professional baseball pitcher in Minor League Baseball who is currently a free agent.

Career
Poulson attended Piner High School in Santa Rosa, California. He tried out for the school's baseball team, but did not make it as a freshman. After he graduated, he enrolled at Santa Rosa Junior College, where he played American football as a linebacker for two years.

After a year, Poulson went to work for his father's excavation business as a truck driver. His father encouraged him to give sports another try, so he joined a Sunday night league. There, he was referred to a coach of the Academy of Art University's baseball team, and the school offered Poulson a scholarship to enroll. His only season for the Urban Knights was not successful, however, with an 8.38 earned run average (ERA) in  innings pitched. After the season, he joined the Healdsburg Prune Packers of the Golden State Collegiate Baseball League. Through coaching, he became able to throw a  fastball. He recorded a 1.45 ERA with 31 strikeouts in  innings, allowing only six hits.

Poulson was not selected in the 2014 Major League Baseball Draft. After the draft, Poulson threw for scouts at the Art Academy, who were impressed with his velocity. The Twins signed Poulson to a free agent contract with a $250,000 signing bonus. He made his professional debut with the Elizabethton Twins of the Rookie-level Appalachian League. In six games with Elizabethton, he struck out nine batters in  innings, but walked 13 en route to an 8.59 ERA.

Poulson improved in 2015 with the GCL Twins of the Gulf Coast League, whiffing 26 batters in  innings and recording a 3.10 ERA and his first professional win. However, the Twins decided the 25-year-old no longer fit into their plans and released him. On April 5, 2016, Poulson signed with the Southern Maryland Blue Crabs of the Atlantic League of Professional Baseball, but was cut in spring training. Poulson moved on to the Joliet Slammers of the independent Frontier League and pitched five innings spread over eight games, allowing only four hits—but his control continued be a problem, as he allowed fifteen walks and twelve runs scored. The Slammers released Poulson, and as of 2018 he has not signed with another team.

References

External links

1990 births
Living people
People from Santa Rosa, California
Baseball players from California
Baseball pitchers
Elizabethton Twins players
Academy of Art University alumni
Santa Rosa Bear Cubs football players